Coming on Strong may refer to:

 "Coming on Strong" (song), a song by Brenda Lee
 Coming on Strong (Brenda Lee album), a 1966 album by Brenda Lee
 Coming on Strong (album), an album by Hot Chip

See also
 Comin' On Strong, a 2003 album by Trace Adkins
 Comin' On Strong (James Moody album), 1963
 "Comin' On Strong" (Broken English song), 1987
 "Comin' On Strong" (Desiya song), 1991